Foxbat is a 1977 action spy film directed by Po-Chih Leong, co-written by Terence Young, and starring Henry Silva, Vonetta McGee, Rik Van Nutter, and Roy Chiao. It is based on an original story by Philip Chan and Leong, and is based on the circumstances surrounding the defection of Soviet Air Force pilot Viktor Belenko and the capture of the MiG-25 “Foxbat” fighter.

It was the first English-language production for the Hong Kong-based Leong. English filmmaker Young made some contributions to the script, which led to him being advertised as a co-director in many countries, though he was not involved in the actual shooting of the film. Despite being targeted at the American market, it was not released in the United States theatrically, and was eventually aired on CBS under the title ‘’Operation Foxbat’’.

Plot
An international race is being waged to obtain the blueprints of a MIG-25 Foxbat Soviet fighter plane that has landed in Japan. Michael Saxon, an undercover U.S. spy, has secretly taken photos of the aircraft, and now he faces overwhelming odds to transport the microfilm back to his home country. While Saxon bides time in Hong Kong, a Chinese cook accidentally swallows the microfilm, and unwittingly becomes a target as well.

Cast

Henry Silva as Michael Saxon
Vonetta McGee as Toni Hill
Rik Van Nutter as Crays
James Yi Lui as Cheung
Roy Chiao as Vod
Gigo Tevzadze as Mr. Lamont
Philip Chan as Lee
Melvin Wong as Victor
Hung Wong as Musad
Fred Marshall as Dahlbeck
Nick Lam Wai Kei as Boris
Chin-tai Tse as Sung
Mei-te Tan as Mrs. Lamont
Chung-hsin Tang as Chow
Yuen Wah as Feng

Release
The film was initially released in Hong Kong under the title Woo fook on 15 December 1977. While not receiving a US theatrical release, it was subsequently broadcast on CBS television.

See also
 List of Hong Kong films of 1977

External links
 

1977 films
1970s spy action films
Hong Kong action films
1970s English-language films
English-language Hong Kong films
Cold War spy films
Films shot in Hong Kong
Films shot in Tokyo
Films set in Hong Kong
Films set in Tokyo
1970s Hong Kong films